Introducing the Hardline According to Terence Trent D'Arby is the debut studio album by Terence Trent D'Arby. It was released in July 1987 on Columbia Records, and debuted at number one in the UK, spending a total of nine weeks (non-consecutively) at the top of the UK Albums Chart. It hit number 1 in Australia and Switzerland. It was eventually certified 5× Platinum (for sales of 1.5 million copies). Worldwide, the album sold a million copies within the first three days of going on sale. The album was also a hit in the US, although its success was slower. It was released there in October 1987, eventually peaking at number four on May 7, 1988, – the same week that the single "Wishing Well" hit number one on the US Billboard Hot 100. It did peak higher on the Billboard R&B Albums chart at number one around the same time.

Other singles from the album included "If You Let Me Stay", which was a top-ten hit in the UK, and "Sign Your Name", which reached number four on the Billboard Hot 100 and number two in the UK. A fourth single, "Dance, Little Sister", reached the UK top 20 as well. As was common for big-selling artists at that time, the singles were released in a plethora of limited editions in multiple formats. These were bolstered by a multitude of non-album studio and live tracks.

Legacy
The album was included in the book 1001 Albums You Must Hear Before You Die.  In 2012, journalist Daryl Easlea said the album was crystallized as Trent's moment, "a soundtrack to the turning point when the 80s turned from austerity to prosperity. It's as central to that decade as the much-seen image of the city trader waving his wad of banknotes to the camera. It remains one big, infectiously glorious record."

Track listing
All tracks written by D'Arby, except where noted.
"If You All Get to Heaven" – 5:17
"If You Let Me Stay" – 3:14
"Wishing Well" (D'Arby, Sean Oliver) – 3:30
"I'll Never Turn My Back on You (Father's Words)" – 3:37
"Dance Little Sister" – 3:55
"Seven More Days" – 4:32
"Let's Go Forward" – 5:32
"Rain" – 2:58
"Sign Your Name" – 4:37
"As Yet Untitled" – 5:33
"Who's Loving You" (William "Smokey" Robinson) – 4:24

Personnel
Terence Trent D'Arby – vocals, keyboards, piano, drums, percussion, baritone saxophone, all instruments on "Sign Your Name" and "As Yet Untitled"
Bruce Smith, Preston Heyman, Clive Mngaza – drums, percussion
Sean Oliver, Phil Spalding, Cass Lewis – bass
Nick Plytas, Andy Whitmore – keyboards
Pete Glenister, "Blast" Murray, Tim Cansfield – guitars
Christian Marsac – guitar, saxophone
Ivar Ybrad – sinubla
Frank Ricotti – percussion
Mel Collins – saxophone
Glenn Gregory, Tony Jackson, Frank Collins, Ebo Ross, Lance Ellington, Michele Oldland – backing vocals
Strings on "Sign Your Name" scored by Chris Cameron

Production
Arranged by Terence Trent D'Arby
Produced by Terence Trent D'Arby and Martyn Ware, except "If You Let Me Stay" and "Seven More Days" (produced by Howard Grey).
Recorded and Mixed by Phil "Foghorn" Legg.
Remix and additional overdubs on "If You Let Me Stay" by Michael H. Brauer

Charts

Weekly charts

Year-end charts

Certifications and sales

Awards and nominations
 1988 – Soul Train and Grammy Award nomination for Best New Artist
 1988 – BRIT Awards International Breakthrough Act – Terence Trent D'Arby
 1988 – Grammy Awards Best Male R&B Vocal Performance

See also
 List of number-one R&B albums of 1988 (U.S.)
 List of number-one albums from the 1980s (UK)
 Number-one albums of 1988 (Australia)

References

External links

Introducing the Hardline According to Terence Trent D'Arby (Adobe Flash) at Radio3Net (streamed copy where licensed)

1987 debut albums
Terence Trent D'Arby albums
Columbia Records albums
Funk rock albums by American artists